American Arts Commemorative Series Medallions are a series of ten gold bullion medallions that were produced by the United States Mint from 1980 to 1984. They were sold to compete with the South African Krugerrand and other bullion coins.

The series was proposed by North Carolina Senator Jesse Helms after the United States Department of the Treasury began selling portions of the national stockpile of gold. Iowa Representative Jim Leach suggested that the medallions depict notable American artists. President Jimmy Carter signed the bill containing the authorizing legislation into law on November 10, 1978, despite objections from Treasury officials.

The medallions were initially sold through mail order; purchasers were required to obtain the day's price by telephone before ordering. Later, the Mint sold them through telemarketing. Mintage ceased after the ten different medallions approved by Congress were produced. All were struck at the West Point Bullion Depository. The series sold poorly, prompting critics to blame the involved process by which they were first marketed, and the fact that they were medallions rather than coins.

Background 

On April 19, 1978, the United States Treasury Department announced that a portion of the national gold stockpile was to be auctioned through the General Services Administration (GSA) beginning on May 23, 1978, in the form of  bars. According to the Treasury, the sales were intended to "[reduce] the U.S. trade deficit, either by increasing the exports of gold or by reducing the imports of this commodity", and to "further the U.S. desire to continue progress toward the elimination of the international monetary role of gold". For reasons of bookkeeping, an entire bar was set as the minimum purchase, which placed the gold outside of the reach of most Americans. North Carolina senator Jesse Helms was critical of the plan, saying that he was "opposed to the sale of U.S. gold to foreign and international banks and gold dealers" and that medallions should be "produced in small size, suitable for sale to average citizens". On the day of the Treasury announcement, Helms introduced the Gold Medallion Act of 1978. The stated intent was to provide average consumers with affordable, small-sized gold bullion to compete with the South African Krugerrand and other world bullion coins, which were becoming increasingly popular with American investors. 1.6 million troy ounces (50,000 kg) ounces of gold had been imported into the United States in the form of Krugerrands in 1977 alone. In a hearing on August 25, 1978, before the United States Senate Committee on Banking, Housing, and Urban Affairs, Helms said:

Helms went on to describe the characteristics of the proposed medallions, stating:

Support for the medallions grew in Congress, prompting the introduction of more legislation. Iowa representative Jim Leach proposed that the series feature designs honoring American artists. During the Committee on Banking, Housing and Urban Affairs hearing, Leach outlined the reasons for his proposal. He noted that the House Subcommittee on Historic Preservation received many suggestions of individuals worthy to appear on the dollar coin that had previously been proposed. Leach felt that a dollar coin was not a suitable way to commemorate the individuals, as it was impossible to honor such a large group on a coin whose design was likely to remain unchanged for a long period of time. He also noted that all United States coinage until then had depicted individuals whose principal contributions had been in government and politics rather than the arts. Leach described the specifics of his proposal, stating:

The subjects designated were painter Grant Wood, contralto singer Marian Anderson, authors Mark Twain and Willa Cather, musician Louis Armstrong, architect Frank Lloyd Wright, poet Robert Frost, sculptor Alexander Calder, actress Helen Hayes and author John Steinbeck.

Though the program received widespread support in Congress, Treasury officials opposed it. In a letter, Treasury secretary W. Michael Blumenthal wrote, "I do not believe the U.S. Government should permit the erroneous impression to be created that it cannot or will not take the necessary steps to combat inflation and that the public therefore needs to buy gold as a hedge against inflation." Blumenthal also believed that if the government were to sanction the striking of gold medallions, the public would believe that the Treasury was actively encouraging investment in gold. Despite these objections, the bill was attached to the bank omnibus bill, which President Jimmy Carter signed into law on November 10, 1978.

Production and sale 

The Treasury lacked money to put the medallions into production, so an appropriations bill was passed giving the department the necessary funding. The GSA was tasked with determining how best to market the new issues. The GSA proposed several sales plans, including the distribution of the medallions to a network of banks for sale to the public. This was rejected in favor of requiring purchasers to make a telephone call to learn the price of the medallions on the day of purchase, after which the purchaser was to go to a post office the same day to make payment. According to the legislation, the issues were to be "sold to the general public at a competitive price equal to the free market value of the gold contained therein plus the cost of manufacture, including labor, materials, dies, use of machinery, and overhead expenses including marketing costs".

Production began in 1980. Struck at the West Point Bullion Depository, the medallions contained 90% gold, and were issued in two sizes: one containing one troy ounce (31 g) of gold and one containing one half-ounce (16 g) of the metal. The first struck were those honoring Grant Wood on the one ounce medallion and Marian Anderson on the half-ounce piece. Both were designed by United States Mint Chief Engraver Frank Gasparro. Sales were poor, and in September 1980, the Mint announced that a private firm, commodity traders J. Aron and Company, would market the medallions. The new plan involved selling the medallions through a network of bullion dealers, banks, brokerage houses and coin dealers, a system similar to that South Africa used to distribute the Krugerrand in the US. In 1981, the second year of production, the composition of the medallions was changed; although the 90% gold purity was retained, the balance was altered to include silver, which was added to change their appearance. That year's medallions depicted Mark Twain and Willa Cather. These were designed by Matthew Poloso and Sherl Winter, respectively. These first four medallions bore no notation of their metallic content or country of origin. This was done to distinguish them from federal coinage. Beginning in 1982, this information and small, toothlike designs, known as "denticles", were added along the inner rim of the medallions, and reeding was added to the edge. That year's issues depicted Louis Armstrong, as designed by John Mercanti, and Frank Lloyd Wright, designed by Edgar Steever. The following year's medallions depicted Robert Frost and Alexander Calder. The former was designed by P. Fowler, while the latter was by Michael Iacocca. The final year of production saw the mintage of medallions with designs by John Mercanti honoring Helen Hayes and John Steinbeck. The Mint terminated the contract with J. Aron and Company in 1984, opting instead to sell the medallions through a telemarketing program. In 1985, Mint director Donna Pope announced that the medallions would be sold in another telemarketing operation in sets of five of either one each of the one ounce medallions or one each of the half-ounce pieces, beginning in September of that year and ending on December 31, or sooner if all sets sold.

Reception 

In October 1980, Luis Vigdor, assistant vice-president for bullion and numismatic operations of Manfra, Tordella & Brookes, then one of the largest coin firms in the country, compared the medallions and the efforts to market them unfavorably to the South African Krugerrand. According to Vigdor, they were difficult to market due to their lack of notation of weight, fineness and country of origin. He also criticized the marketing, asserting that people were unlikely to buy gold at the post office, and that the medallions were advertised poorly. Vigdor contrasted the medallions' marketing program with the widespread success of the Krugerrand and the vigorous attempts to market them around the world. Commenting on the poor sale of the medallions, assistant director of marketing for the Mint Francis Frere said in 1984: "it just hasn't worked. They're not selling. We've made a strong effort, but it's not working."

On February 12, 1982, following the poor sales of the medallions, the United States Gold Commission recommended the minting of a gold coin. Donald Regan, Secretary of the Treasury and chairman of the commission, later told reporters that a gold coin could be easier to sell than medallions, because the suggested coins "could be redeemable in dollars". The Mint issued gold coins for the 1984 Summer Olympics in Los Angeles and for the centennial of the Statue of Liberty in 1986. Both issues were successful, and the Liberty piece sold out on advance sales. As the public was receptive to the gold coins, and President Ronald Reagan had banned the importation of Krugerrands in 1985 over South Africa's apartheid policy, Congress authorized the American Gold Eagle gold bullion coin, which entered production as legal tender in 1986.

Designs and sales figures

Notes

References

Bibliography 

 
 
 
 
 
 
 
 
 
 
 
 
 

1980 introductions
1980s in the United States
Exonumia
United States gold coins
United States commemorative medals
Cultural depictions of Mark Twain
Cultural depictions of Frank Lloyd Wright
Cultural depictions of Louis Armstrong
Willa Cather
Grant Wood
Robert Frost
John Steinbeck
Bullion coins of the United States
Gold bullion coins